Green Hill is a historic plantation house and national historic district located near Long Island, Campbell County, Virginia.  The main house is a two-story, five bay, brick structure with a gable roof, modillioned cornice and two interior end chimneys. The one-story rear ell was built about 1800. The interior features fine woodwork. Also on the property are a contributing frame outbuilding with a partially enclosed shed porch, a brick duck house, an ice house, a kitchen, stone laundry, a frame slave quarters, frame kitchen with stone chimney, mounting block, two log barns, the ruins of a rather large stone stable, and a large tobacco barn.

It was listed on the National Register of Historic Places in 1969.

References

External links
Green Hill Plantation & Main House, State Route 728, Long Island, Campbell County, VA: 12 photos and 7 data pages at Historic American Buildings Survey
Green Hill Plantation, Frame Dependency, State Route 728, Long Island, Campbell County, VA: 1 photo and 2 data pages at Historic American Buildings Survey
Green Hill Plantation, Icehouse, State Route 728, Long Island, Campbell County, VA: 2 photos and 2 data pages at Historic American Buildings Survey
Green Hill Plantation, Brick Dependency, State Route 728, Long Island, Campbell County, VA: 2 photos and 2 data pages at Historic American Buildings Survey
Green Hill Plantation, Slave Auction Block, State Route 728, Long Island, Campbell County, VA: 2 photos and 2 data pages at Historic American Buildings Survey
Green Hill Plantation, Kitchen, State Route 728, Long Island, Campbell County, VA: 3 photos and 4 data pages at Historic American Buildings Survey
Green Hill Plantation, Slave Quarters, State Route 728, Long Island, Campbell County, VA: 1 photo and 3 data pages at Historic American Buildings Survey
Green Hill Plantation, Slave Quarters, State Route 728, Long Island, Campbell County, VA: 1 photo and 3 data pages at Historic American Buildings Survey
Green Hill Plantation, Duck House, State Route 728, Long Island, Campbell County, VA: 1 photo and 3 data pages at Historic American Buildings Survey
Green Hill Plantation, Laundry, State Route 728, Long Island, Campbell County, VA: 4 photos and 4 data pages at Historic American Buildings Survey
Green Hill Plantation, Frame Barn, State Route 728, Long Island, Campbell County, VA: 1 photo and 3 data pages at Historic American Buildings Survey
Green Hill Plantation, Log Barn, State Route 728, Long Island, Campbell County, VA: 1 photo and 3 data pages at Historic American Buildings Survey
Green Hill Plantation, Stable (Ruins), State Route 728, Long Island, Campbell County, VA: 1 photo and 2 data pages at Historic American Buildings Survey
Green Hill Plantation, Granary, State Route 728, Long Island, Campbell County, VA: 3 photos and 4 data pages at Historic American Buildings Survey
Green Hill Plantation, Tobacco Barn, State Route 728, Long Island, Campbell County, VA: 3 photos and 4 data pages at Historic American Buildings Survey
Green Hill Plantation, Cobblestone Walks & Drives, State Route 728, Long Island, Campbell County, VA: 1 photo and 1 data page at Historic American Buildings Survey
Green Hill Plantation, Gateposts, State Route 728, Long Island, Campbell County, VA: 1 photo and 2 data pages at Historic American Buildings Survey
Green Hill Plantation, Log Quarters, Long Island, Campbell County, VA: 1 photo at Historic American Buildings Survey

Historic American Buildings Survey in Virginia
Plantation houses in Virginia
Historic districts on the National Register of Historic Places in Virginia
Houses on the National Register of Historic Places in Virginia
Houses completed in 1800
Houses in Campbell County, Virginia
National Register of Historic Places in Campbell County, Virginia
Slave cabins and quarters in the United States